Dangerous Songs!? is a studio album by Pete Seeger and was released in 1966 on the Columbia Records label.

Track listing

Personnel
Pete Seeger
Fred Hellerman - vocal and guitar on "The Draft Dodger Rag"

References

1966 albums
Pete Seeger albums
Columbia Records albums
Albums produced by John Hammond (producer)